Nick Cross is a Canadian animator, artist, cartoonist, director, writer, and producer based in Los Angeles, California. His works include The Waif of Persephone, Yellow Cake, Pig Farmer, and Black Sunrise, which he wrote, directed, animated and produced. He is friends with graphic novel artist Troy Little and they collaborated on the development of the animated series Angora Napkin. He directed the pilot for the Nickelodeon series Pig Goat Banana Cricket created by graphic novel creator Dave Cooper and alternative comics creator Johnny Ryan. He was the art director for the Cartoon Network acclaimed miniseries Over the Garden Wall as well as the network's shorts development program. He was the supervising producer on the Cartoon Network and HBO Max series Tig n' Seek.

He is married to cartoonist Marlo Meekins.

Black Sunrise
Black Sunrise is a planned feature film, produced and animated entirely by Nick Cross. Cross began the film before the rise in popularity of the internet, at which time he considered notions like the Illuminati and secret societies more mysterious and interesting to the general public than they are today. After completing 15 minutes of animation, time constraints prevented Cross from continuing his work on the film. Cross believes that the film, if completed, will not be received favorably because the topic of secret societies is overexposed, but he might still release segments of the film.

Filmography

References

External links
 
 Nick Cross on YouTube

Canadian art directors
Background artists
Canadian animated film directors
Canadian animated film producers
Canadian male screenwriters
Canadian storyboard artists
Canadian television directors
Canadian television producers
Canadian television writers
Canadian male television writers
Canadian expatriates in the United States
Cartoon Network Studios people
Living people
1971 births
Spümcø
Prop designers
21st-century Canadian screenwriters
21st-century Canadian male writers